Stacey Q's Greatest Hits is a greatest hits album by American singer Stacey Q, released on May 16, 1995 by Thump Records. It was re-released on February 6, 2007 under the title Queen of the 80's with a slightly different track listing. Although it is a greatest hits album, the compilation includes only songs from her studio album Better Than Heaven (1986) and her early career with the bands Q and SSQ. Some of the album's material was re-recorded, giving the originally dance-pop and synthpop songs house and eurodance music to achieve more commercial sound.

The compilation features fourteen tracks, including her hit singles "Two of Hearts" and "We Connect", as well as other songs from her studio album Better Than Heaven. Other songs were taken from the album Playback (1983), recorded with the band SSQ. The songs "Playback", "Video Girl" and "Music's Gone" had previously appeared on an extended play recorded with Q and the song "Shy Girl" appeared on the Stacey Q extended play. The previously unreleased songs on the album are "The Model" and "Heartless".


Track listings

Credits adapted from the liner notes of Stacey Q's Greatest Hits.

References

External links
[ Stacey Q's Greatest Hits] at AllMusic

1995 greatest hits albums
Stacey Q albums
Dance music compilation albums